Nefarious is an EP by indie rock band Spoon, their debut recording.  It was released in 1994 on a tiny Texas-based imprint called Fluffer Records.

Track listing
 "Government Darling" – 2:33
 "This Damn Nation" – 2:31
 "Nefarious" – 2:45
 "Not Turning Off" – 3:01

Trivia
 "This Damn Nation" is a cover of The Godfathers.
 "Government Darling", "Nefarious" and "Not Turning Off" were later re-recorded and released on Telephono.

References

Spoon (band) albums
1994 debut EPs